Võro is a dialect  of South Estonian belonging to the Finnic branch of the Uralic language family. Traditionally, it has been considered a dialect  of the Estonian language along with all varieties of South Estonian. However, many linguists consider South Estonian to be an independent Finnic language.
It has its own literary standard and efforts have been undertaken to seek official recognition as an indigenous regional language of Estonia. Võro has roughly 75,000 speakers (Võros) mostly in southeastern Estonia, in the eight parishes of the historical Võru County: Karula, Harglõ, Urvastõ, Rõugõ, Kanepi, Põlva, Räpinä and Vahtsõliina. These parishes are currently centred (due to redistricting) in Võru and Põlva counties, with parts extending into Valga and Tartu counties. Speakers can also be found in the cities of Tallinn and Tartu and the rest of Estonia.

History

Võro is a descendant of the old South Estonian regional language and is the least influenced by Standard Estonian (which is based on Northern Estonian dialects). Võro was once spoken further south and east of historical Võromaa in South Estonian-speaking enclaves Lutsi, Leivu and Kraasna in what is now Latvia and Russia. In addition to Võro, other contemporary variants of South Estonian include the Mulgi, Tartu and Seto dialect.

One of the earliest written evidences of South Estonian is a translation of the New Testament (Wastne Testament) published in 1686. Although the status of South Estonian began to diminish after the 1880s, the language began to undergo a revival in the late 1980s.

Present situation
Today, Võro is used in the works of some of Estonia's best-known playwrights, poets, and authors (Madis Kõiv, Ülle Kauksi, Jaan Kaplinski, Ain Kaalep, etc.). One newspaper is printed in Võro: the fortnightly Uma Leht (literally Our Own Newspaper). Twenty six public schools offer weekly special classes (mostly extracurricular) in modern Võro.

Estonia's contribution to the Eurovision Song Contest 2004 was the song "Tii", which was performed by Neiokõsõ in Võro.

The language is endangered, and according to Kadri Koreinik this is due to the government's lack of legal commitment to protect the language.

Orthography

Võro employs the Latin script, like Estonian and Finnish.

Most letters (including ä, ö, ü, and õ) denote the same sounds as in Estonian, with a few exceptions. The letter q stands for the glottal stop  and y denotes , a vowel very close to Russian ы (from 2005 written õ).

Palatalization of consonants is marked with an acute accent (´) or apostrophe ('). In proper typography and in handwriting, the palatalisation mark does not extend above the cap height (except uppercase letters Ń, Ŕ, Ś, V́ etc.), and it is written above the letter if the letter has no ascender (ǵ, ḿ, ń, ṕ, ŕ, ś, v́ etc.) but written to the right of it otherwise (b’, d’, f’, h’, k’, l’, t’). In computing, it is not usually possible to enter these character combinations or to make them look esthetically pleasing with most common fonts, so the apostrophe is generally placed after the letter in all cases. This convention is followed in this article as well.

Phonology

Vowels

Vowel harmony

Võro has preserved the system of vowel harmony that was present in Proto-Finnic. This distinguishes it from Estonian and some other Finnic languages, which have lost it.

The vowel harmony system distinguishes front, back and neutral vowels, much like the system found in Finnish. A word cannot contain both front and back vowels; suffixes automatically adapt the backness of the vowels depending on the type of vowels found in the word it is attached to. Neutral vowels can be combined with either type of vowel, although a word that contains only neutral vowels has front vowel harmony. The only neutral vowel is i, like in Votic but unlike Finnish and Karelian, where e is also neutral.

The vowel ɨ (in the Võro orthography written with õ or y, see Orthography section) is considered a back vowel for harmony purposes, but does not participate in harmony itself, as it does not occur in suffixes and endings.

Some examples, with Estonian and Finnish included for comparison:

Consonants

All Võro consonants (except  and ) can be palatalized. The glottal stop (q, IPA ) is a very common sound in Võro.

Grammar

Nouns

Endings are shown only in the back vowel harmony variant. The e of the illative ending does not undergo vowel harmony, so it never changes to õ.

Only the more common endings are shown. There are some unusual/irregular endings that are only found in a few words or word types.

Notes:
 The accusative is not usually considered a separate case in Võro grammars, as it is always identical to either the nominative or the genitive.
 When an ending beginning with d is attached to a stem ending in an obstruent, it is devoiced to t automatically.

Verbs

The 3rd person singular of the indicative mood can be either without an ending or, alternatively, with an s-ending:

Among the Finnic languages, such double verb conjugation can be found only in the South Estonian and Karelian languages.

Negation

Võro has a negative particle that is appended to the end of the verb, whereas standard Estonian and Finnish have a negative verb, which precedes the verb. In Estonian and Finnish, the negative verb ei (Finnish en/et/ei/emme/ette/eivät) is used in both present and past negation, whereas in Võro the same is expressed by different particles ending with -i(q) or -s:

Language examples

Written examples

Article 1 of the Universal Declaration of Human Rights in Võro:

As comparison the same sentence in Standard Estonian:

In Finnish:

Recorded videos

See also

 Finnic languages
 South Estonian language
 Uma Leht, newspaper in the Võro language
 Võro Institute

References

Further reading

 Ehala, Martin & Niglas, Katrin (2007): "Empirical evaluation of a mathematical model of ethnolinguistic vitality: the case of Võro". Journal of Multilingual and Multicultural Development.
 Kalle Eller (1999): Võro-Seto language. Võro Instituut'. Võro.
 Iva, Sulev; Pajusalu, Karl (2004): "The Võro Language: Historical Development and Present Situation". In: Language Policy and Sociolinguistics I: "Regional Languages in the New Europe" International Scientific Conference; Rēzeknes Augstskola, Latvija; 20–23 May 2004. Rezekne: Rezekne Augstskolas Izdevnieceba, 2004, 58 – 63.
 Iva, Sulev (2007): Võru kirjakeele sõnamuutmissüsteem (Inflectional Morphology in the Võro Literary Language). Dissertationes Philologiae Estonicae Universitatis Tartuensis 20, Tartu: Tartu Ülikooli Kirjastus (online: English summary pp 144–146) (PDF)
 Iva, Sulev (pen name Jüvä Sullõv), (2002): Võro-eesti synaraamat (Võro-Estonian dictionary). Publications of Võro Institute 12. Tarto-Võro.
 Keem, Hella (1997): Võru keel (Võro language). Võro Instituut ja Eesti teaduste akadeemia Emakeele selts. Tallinn.
 Koreinik, Kadri (2007): The Võro language in education in Estonia. Regional dossiers series. Mercator. European Research Centre on Multilingualism and Language Learning (online: PDF).
 Koreinik, Kadri; Pajusalu, Karl (2007): "Language naming practices and linguistic identity in South-Eastern Estonia". Language and Identity in the Finno-Ugric World. Proceedings of the Fourth International Symposium at the University of Groningen, May 17–19, 2006. R. Blokland and C. Hasselblatt (eds). (Studia Fenno-Ugrica Groningana 4). Maastricht: Shaker.

External links

 Võro language and alphabet at Omniglot
 Võro-Estonian dictionary (Võro Institute) 
 Võro Institute 
 Võro language newspaper "Uma Leht" 
 Audio example of Võro language
 Võro synthetic voice 
 Oahpa – an internet program for learners of Võro 
 "Estonian dialects and layers" on http://www.estonica.org 
 Documentation for ISO 639 identifier: vro
 Homepage of computer programs in Võro  
 English-Võro dictionary of computer terms  
 Eurominority
 Uralic languages (Salminen 2003)
 Online games in Võro language 
 Collection of cartoons in Võro 

Võro
Definitely endangered languages
Finnic languages
Estonian dialects
Languages of Estonia
Põlva County
South Estonian language
Võru County
Vowel-harmony languages